Babu Bhoop Singh (born 1820) was the ruler of Kohra estate of Oudh (Now in Amethi district, Uttar Pradesh) from 1840 to 1890 and belongs from Bandhalgoti  clan of Rajput. He was leader in the Indian Rebellion of 1857. He led a rebellion against the British forces in 1857. He was involved in the War of Awadh of 1857 and the siege of Lucknow residency and to stop Colonel Wroughton, he fought battles at Chanda, Amhat and Kadunala in Sultanpur district. His property was taken under the management of Court of Wards in 1859. On order of Calcutta High Court, by government removed Court of Wards from Kohra in 1870. Later estate was ruled by Babu Shiv Datt Singh.

See also 
 Kohra (estate)
 Amethi

References 

 
1820 births
Year of death unknown
Place of death unknown
Date of birth unknown
Revolutionaries of the Indian Rebellion of 1857
People from Amethi
19th-century Indian monarchs
Rajput rulers
Indian revolutionaries
Indian independence activists from Uttar Pradesh
Royalty
19th-century Indian people

Indian royalty